Harold Kasket (26 July 1926 – 20 January 2002) was an English actor in theatre, films and later television from the 1940s. Kasket usually played Arabs or mainland European types in many films and TV programmes such as Maigret, The Saint, Danger Man, Z-Cars, Department S and The Tomorrow People.

His theatre work included appearances with Laurence Olivier and Vivien Leigh on Broadway in Caesar and Cleopatra in 1951; and playing Uncle Ben opposite Warren Mitchell at the National Theatre in Death of a Salesman in 1979.

His last role was in the TV mini series War and Remembrance (1988).

He died in his native London.

Selected filmography

 No Orchids for Miss Blandish (1948) - (uncredited)
 Children of Chance (1949) - (uncredited)
 Hotel Sahara (1951) - Oriental Gentleman (uncredited)
 Made in Heaven (1952) - The Fat Man (uncredited)
 Moulin Rouge (1952) - Charles Zidler
 The House of the Arrow (1953) - Boris Wabersky
 Saadia (1953) - Sheikh of Inimert
 Up to His Neck (1954) - Croupier (uncredited)
 Beau Brummell (1954) - Mayor
 One Good Turn (1955) - Ivor Petrovitch
 Out of the Clouds (1955) - Hafadi
 The Dark Avenger (1955) - Arnaud
 A Kid for Two Farthings (1955) - (uncredited)
 Doctor at Sea (1955) - Policeman in Prison (uncredited)
 Man of the Moment (1955) - Enrico
 The Man Who Knew Too Much (1956) - Stavis, Embassy Butler (uncredited)
 Bhowani Junction (1956) - Proprietor of Restaurant (uncredited)
 Interpol (1957) - Kalish
 The Key Man (1957) - Dimitriadi
 Manuela (1957) - Pereira
 The Naked Earth (1958) - Arab Captain
 A Tale of Two Cities (1958) - Jailer (uncredited)
 Wonderful Things! (1958) - Poppa
 The 7th Voyage of Sinbad (1958) - Sultan
 The Navy Lark (1959) - Gaston Higgins
 The Heart of a Man (1959) - Oskar
 The Lady Is a Square (1959) - Spolenski
 Whirlpool (1959) - Stiebel
 Carlton-Browne of the F.O. (1959) - Minor Role (uncredited)
 The Mouse That Roared (1959) - Pedro
 The Scapegoat (1959) - (uncredited)
 Face of Fire (1959) - Reifsnyder, the barber
 SOS Pacific (1959) - Monk
 Tommy the Toreador (1959) - Jose
 Life Is a Circus (1960) - Hassan
 The Boy Who Stole a Million (1960) - Luis 
 Sands of the Desert (1960) - Abdulla
The Fourth Square (1961) - Philippe
 The Greengage Summer (1961) - Monsieur Prideaux
 A Weekend with Lulu (1961) - Bon Viveur (uncredited)
 The Green Helmet (1961) - Lupi
 The Roman Spring of Mrs. Stone (1961) - Tailor
 Village of Daughters (1962) - Bus driver
 Nine Hours to Rama (1963) - Datta
 The Yellow Rolls-Royce (1964) - Italian Garage Owner (uncredited)
 The Return of Mr. Moto (1965) - Shahrdar of Wadi
 Doctor in Clover (1966) - Husband in French Movie (uncredited)
 Arabesque (1966) - Mohammed Lufti
 Follow That Camel (1967) - Hotel Gentleman (uncredited)
 Where's Jack? (1969) - The King
 Trail of the Pink Panther (1982) - President Sandover Haleesh
 Curse of the Pink Panther (1983) - President Sandover Haleesh
 A.D. (1985) - Caiaphas

References

External links
 
 

1926 births
2002 deaths
English male television actors
English male film actors
English male stage actors
Male actors from London